The men's 182 kilometres road race competition at the 2014 Asian Games was held on 28 September. Jang Kyung-gu from South Korea who was 13th in last Asian Games, became the winner.

Schedule
All times are Korea Standard Time (UTC+09:00)

Results 
Legend
DNF — Did not finish

References 

Results

External links 
Official website

Road Men